Uhuru Park is a 12.9 hectare recreational park adjacent to the central business district of Nairobi, Kenya. It was opened to the general public by the late Mzee Jomo Kenyatta on 23 May 1969. It contains an artificial lake, several national monuments, and an assembly ground which has become a popular skateboarding spot on weekends and also a location for local skateboarding competitions (best trick contest 2017), catering to Nairobi's growing skate scene. 

Apart from skateboarding, the assembly ground is used for occasional political and religious gatherings. It is infamous as the site where protest against illegal land grabbing was violently broken up by the Moi regime. In 2021, the park came under scrutiny for an attempted renovation which included removing old trees. A national court halted the project, due to environmental concerns.

History 
In 1989, Wangari Maathai and many of her followers held a protest at the park, attempting to stop the construction of the 60-storey Kenya Times Media Trust business complex. She was forced by the government to vacate her office and was vilified in parliament, but her protests and the government's response led foreign investors to cancel the project.

In August 1996, a group led by a Catholic cardinal and Archbishop Maurice Michael Otunga burned a heap of condoms in Uhuru Park.

Uhuru Park was the scene of a bomb blast in June 2010, which killed six people and left over 100 people injured. The attack targeted a "NO" campaign rally for the forthcoming constitutional referendum.

Gallery

References

Nairobi
Parks in Kenya